Roy K. Ilowit (April 3, 1917 – January 3, 1990) was an American football player and coach.

References

External links
 
 

1917 births
1990 deaths
American football tackles
Brooklyn Dodgers (NFL) players
CCNY Beavers football players
LIU Post Pioneers football coaches
Sportspeople from Manhattan
Players of American football from New York City